Viking station is on the Canadian National Railway (CN) mainline in Viking, Alberta. The station is served by Via Rail's The Canadian as a flag stop (48 hours advance notice required).

The old CN station building has been restored and now operates as a tea room, tourist information centre and art gallery, featuring original work from local artists.

References

External links 
Via Rail Station Description

Via Rail stations in Alberta
Beaver County, Alberta
Canadian National Railway stations in Alberta